Palfuria hirsuta is a spider species of the family Zodariidae.

Etymology
The epithet hirsuta (Latin for "hairy") refers to the hairy appearance.

Distribution
P. hirsuta occurs in Zambia.

References

 Szüts, T. & Jocqué, R. (2001). A revision of the Afrotropical spider genus Palfuria (Araneae, Zodariidae). Journal of Arachnology 29(2):205–219. PDF

Zodariidae
Spiders of Africa
Spiders described in 2001